The Oregon Newspaper Publishers Association is a trade association for all paid-circulation daily, weekly, and multi-weekly newspapers in the U.S. state of Oregon.  It represents and promotes newspapers, and encourages excellence in reporting and coverage with an annual series of awards.

History 
The organization was established as the Oregon Press Association in 1887.  It was renamed the Oregon State Editorial Association in 1909, and adopted its current name in 1936.  It currently has about 80 member newspapers plus additional associate member and collegiate member newspapers.

Mission 
Besides providing advertising distribution, it also provides aggregation of public notices and other information from its member newspapers, including state and city calls for bids, changes in municipal code, foreclosures, estate claims, forfeited property, probate, summons, and similar information.

It also may sponsor and organize political debates, such as the 2014 governor candidates' debate.

See also 
 Journalism in Oregon
 Oregon Exchanges

References

Further reading 
 Feature article on ONPA:

External links
 

 
1887 establishments in Oregon
Newspaper associations
Organizations based in Oregon
Organizations established in 1887
Trade associations based in the United States